Tipsy is an American electronic music group. Based in San Francisco, California, it consists of Tim Digulla and David Gardner.

In 1996, Tipsy released an album, Trip Tease, on Asphodel Records. In 2015, Fact placed it at number 44 on the "50 Best Trip-Hop Albums of All Time" list. In 2001, Tipsy released the second album, Uh-Oh!, on Asphodel Records. In 2008, Tipsy released the third album, Buzzz, on Ipecac Recordings.

Discography

Studio albums
 Trip Tease (1996)
 Uh-Oh! (2001)
 Buzzz (2008)

Compilation albums
 Remix Party! (2002)

Singles
 "Nude on the Moon" / "Space Golf" (1996)
 "Grossenhösen Mit Mr. Excitement" (1997)
 "Flying Monkey Fist" (1998)
 "Hard Petting" (2000)

References

External links
 
 

American musical duos
Electronic music duos
Electronic music groups from California
Musical groups from San Francisco